Labeobarbus malacanthus is a species of cyprinid fish found in Gabon and Equatorial Guinea.

References 

malacanthus
Cyprinid fish of Africa
Fish described in 1911